Turridrupa cincta is a species of sea snail, a marine gastropod mollusk in the family Turridae, the turrids.

Description
The length of the broad shell attains 20 mm.

The spire is convex in outline, slightly acuminated towards the tip. The whorls are encircled throughout with tumid ridges. The shell is yellowish brown or reddish brown. The aperture has the same color. 

The sinus apex is situated at the end of the mid-shoulder cord. The cords are smooth. The color  of the shell is yellowish brown.

Distribution
This marine species occurs in the Indian Ocean off Madagascar, Mauritius and off the Mascarenes; also off Japan, the Philippines and Papua New Guinea.

References

 Lamarck JBPA de M. 1822. Histoire naturelle des animaux sans vertebras (Pleurotoma). Paris:Lamarck. Pleurotome. 7, 90–102
 Drivas, J.; Jay, M. (1987). Coquillages de La Réunion et de l'Île Maurice. Collection Les Beautés de la Nature. Delachaux et Niestlé: Neuchâtel. . 159 pp.
 Kilburn R.N. (1988). Turridae (Mollusca: Gastropoda) of southern Africa and Mozambique. Part 4. Subfamilies Drillinae, Crassispirinae and Strictispirinae. Annals of the Natal Museum. 29(1): 167-320.
 Liu, J.Y. [Ruiyu] (ed.). (2008). Checklist of marine biota of China seas. China Science Press. 1267 pp

cincta
Gastropods described in 1822